Greya mitellae is a moth of the family Prodoxidae. It is found in moist coniferous or mixed coniferous forests in north-western Idaho and the Blue Mountains of south-eastern Washington.

The wingspan is 10–15 mm. Adults are sexually dimorphic. The forewings of the larger females are stramineous, while those of the males are brown to dark yellow with a slight purple iridescence. Both sexes have small, dark brown spots. The hindwings are medium to dark grey.

The larvae feed on Mitella stauropetala. The larvae are thought to be leaf miners.

References

Moths described in 1992
Prodoxidae
Taxa named by Donald R. Davis (entomologist)